The 1967 U.S. National Championships (now known as the US Open) was a tennis tournament that took place on the outdoor grass courts at the West Side Tennis Club, Forest Hills in New York City, United States. The tournament ran from 30 August until 10 September. It was the 87th staging of the U.S. National Championships, and the fourth Grand Slam tennis event of 1967. This was the last time the U.S. National Championship was played as an amateur event; the 1968 tournament, also played at West Side Tennis Club's Forest Hills Stadium, became the first U.S.Open, following the French and Wimbledon opens earlier that year.

The three doubles tournaments took place at the Longwood Cricket Club in Brookline, Massachusetts, from 21 to 29 August.

Finals

Men's singles

 John Newcombe defeated  Clark Graebner  6–4, 6–4, 8–6

Women's singles

 Billie Jean King defeated  Ann Haydon Jones  11–9, 6–4

Men's doubles
 John Newcombe /  Tony Roche defeated  William Bowrey /  Owen Davidson 6–8, 9–7, 6–3, 6–3

Women's doubles
 Rosie Casals /  Billie Jean King defeated  Mary-Ann Eisel /  Donna Floyd, 4–6, 6–3, 6–4

Mixed doubles
 Billie Jean King /  Owen Davidson defeated  Rosie Casals /  Stan Smith 6–3, 6–2

References

External links
Official US Open website

 
U.S. National Championships
U.S. National Championships (tennis) by year
U.S. National Championships (tennis)
U.S. National Championships (tennis)
1967 in sports in New York City
1967 in American tennis